Inje County (Inje-gun) is a county in Gangwon Province, South Korea. It has the lowest population density of any South Korean county.

History
Since the first inhabitants came to the Korean peninsula, there have been people living in Inje county.  Surrounded by clear and clean rivers and streams and magnificent Soraksan. Inje is located in the mid-east of Gangwon-do, it was at first called Jeojokhyeon in the Goguryeo Kingdom, Heejaehyeon in the Silla Kingdom, Inje in the Goryeo Dynasty, Youngsohyeon and again later Inje in the Joseon Dynasty and finally raised to the status of Inje county in August 1896.

Korean War
The Republic of Korea Army ROK) 5th Infantry Division recaptured Inje town in Operation Rugged in April 1951 as the UN Forces advanced to the Kansas Line, north of the 38th Parallel.

Inje town was lost again to the Chinese People's Volunteer Army during the Fifth Phase Offensive in late April 1951 and was recaptured in the UN May-June 1951 counteroffensive.

In 1951 the US Marine Corps 1st Medical Battalion operated a field hospital in Inje town.

The 40th Infantry Division assumed responsibility for the defense of the Kansas Line from the 24th Infantry Division from February 1952 supported by the ROK 3rd Infantry Division.

After the war ended, Inje County continued to be a strategic location for the military. The Korea Combat Training Center is located there. The Republic of Korea Army's III Corps headquarters and its subordinate units are scattered in bases throughout the county.

Environment
Inje is located in the Taebaek Mountains and has a landscape dominated by flora. Many species inhabit several areas of the county, not only mountains but rivers also.

Fauna
 Asiatic Black Bear : It populates a wide area from Siberia to Afghanistan and Thailand as well as certain Asian islands such as Taiwan and Japan. In Korea, the Asiatic Black Bear can be found in the areas of Paekdusan, Seoraksan, Jirisan  The Asiatic Black Bear is becoming rare in South Korea. It usually lives in broadleaf forest on peaks higher than 1,500m, finding fruits such as wild grapes, wild berries, fruits of Acfinidia arguta, especially with acorns. The Asiatic Black Bear has developed a good sense of smell and hearing however cannot see very well.
 Musk deer : Among the Musk deer in the northern hemisphere, this species in the North-East is divided into seven subspecies. This subspecies found in the mountains around Mokpo and Jeonranamdo is also reported to be distributed Manchuria, Amur, Ussuri and Eastern Siberia as well as South Korea.

Flora
 Senecio koreanus : The Senecio Koreanus is a Korean Endemic Species.
 Carex chordorhiza : The Carex Chordorhiza is a perennial plant growing with sphagnum in a swamp, at first grows straight and then crawls laterally to take root. From its joint it grows a flower stem of up to 20 cm. Its leaves are flat and 1~1.5 cm wide with colors of gray and green. The heads are egg-like and numbered 2~4 which are 5~7 cm long. Male flowers come out upward but female ones downward without any bracts.
 Megaleranthis saniculifolia : Megaleranthis Saniculifolia is also a Korean Endemic Species and clings to Ranunculaceae. It inhabits the Jeombongsan, Sobaeksan, Jirisan and Taebaeksan areas. Living in the swamps or ridges in deep mountains, the perennial plant sprouts in stubbles. It's between 30 and 40 cm tall. Leaves come from the root of the plant and are divided into three parts at the end, a long leafstalk may be split into two or three parts again.

Geography
Among the basic local governments in Korea, it ranks second in terms of area after Hongcheon and most of Inje-gun on the 38th parallel belonged to the Democratic People's Republic of Korea. Also the remaining areas were incorporated into Shinnam-myeon and Naeyeon, Hongcheon-gun. After the Korean War, most of the borders of Gangwon-do went north and became Inje-gun, but the inner side was not restored and remained under the jurisdiction of Hongcheon-gun. There are many famous hills, such as Jinbu-ryeong, Misiryeong, Hangyeryeong, Eunbi-ryeong, and Gom-Bae-ryeong. Although it is in the Yeongseo area, it is a point connecting Yeongseo and Yeongdong, so the rent is inevitable. It is also sad that it took 102 steps (which has now been disbanded) to go to Gangwon-do at all, but it is natural that it is a very difficult area to serve.

The dwelling is formed on a narrow flatland along the river, and the Inbukcheon River, which runs through Naerincheon Stream, Seohwa, and Wontong area, meets in Inje-eup and flows into Soyangho Lake.

Inje-gun was Chuncheon because it was located in the Soyanggang River basin in the northern region, and its language also uses a Yeongseo dialect similar to Chuncheon. .[8] However, it is difficult to see it as a living area in Chuncheon at present, but the road to go quickly to the construction of the Soyanggang Dam has been submerged, and in the midst of this, the expansion of 44th street has led to active exchanges between Hongcheon - Inje - Sokcho. Expansion Hongcheon - Inje - Sokcho It can be seen as an extended East Seoul living area.

Like the front area of Gangwon-do, it is very cold in winter. The average annual temperature is 10,1 ℃, the average temperature of January, the coldest month, is -5,2 ℃, the average temperature of August, the coldest month is 23,3 ℃, and the lowest temperature ever recorded in January 1981 is -25, 9 ℃, the highest temperature ever recorded on January is -25,9 ℃ all-time, 37,7 ℃ on August 1, 2018. The average annual precipitation is 1,210 mm.

Located on the border of Mt. [9] And on January 8, 2021, -29.1℃ was unofficially recorded at Hyangrobong, making it the coldest in the country.

Instead, you might think summer is cool, but it's not at all. It would be better than the rear area, but even in summer, as long as it doesn't rain, 30℃ is so hot that it's standard. As mentioned above, during the heatwave in 2018, 37.7℃ was recorded. Think of it as a typical continental climate.

Climate
Inje has a monsoon-influenced humid continental climate (Köppen: Dwa) with cold, dry winters and hot, rainy summers.

Daecheong peak
Daecheong Peak is the highest peak in the Mt. Seorak ranges and is located near at the boundary of Inje county and Yangyang county with an altitude of 1,708m.

The beautiful snow scenes around Daecheong peak are widely known. Inje county is quite cold from early November, with snow falling around its higher peaks. In 2007, the first heavy snow of the year was recorded as early as 16 November.

Tourism
Inje is a modest tourist destination for outdoor activities. It is home to the highest bungee jump in South Korea. It also host the Inje Speedium Resort Circuit.

Ice fishing festival
Because of its cold climate, many ice-fishing festivals often occur in Inje and the wider Gangwon-do area. However, the ice fishing in Inje is one of the main attractions in winter with 6,000 tourists per weekday and over 10,000 on weekends.

References

External links
Inje County government home page (in Korean)

 
Counties of Gangwon Province, South Korea
Biosphere reserves of South Korea